The 1901 Bucknell football team was an American football team that represented Bucknell University as an independent during the 1901 college football season. In its third season under head coach George W. Hoskins, the team compiled a 6–4 record and outscored opponents by a total of 145 to 46.

Schedule

References

Bucknell
Bucknell Bison football seasons
Bucknell Bison football